The Masquerade of Death is a Big Finish Productions audio drama featuring Lisa Bowerman as Bernice Summerfield, a character from the spin-off media based on the long-running British science fiction television series Doctor Who.

Plot 
Bernice and Adrian find themselves trapped in a theatrical world where nobody is who they seem to be.

Cast
Bernice Summerfield - Lisa Bowerman
Adrian Wall - Harry Myers
The Player - Robin Sebastian
The Queen - Sunny Ormande
The Spinster - Joyce Gibbs

References

External links
Big Finish Productions - Professor Bernice Summerfield: The Masquerade of Death

Bernice Summerfield audio plays
Fiction set in the 27th century